Kvibille BK is a Swedish football club located in Kvibille, in the county of Halland. The club, formed in 1940, play their home matches at Björkevi. The club came agonizingly close of being promoted to division 3 on two occasions, in recent years. During the 2013 season Kvibille BK finished 5th, just a couple of points short of 1st place. History repeated itself the following season. Kvibille BK finished 6th, with a small gap to 2nd place, which would have meant a possible promotion.

Background
Kvibille BK currently plays in Division 4 Halland Elit which is the sixth tier of Swedish football. They play their home matches at Björkevi in Kvibille.

The club is affiliated to Hallands Fotbollförbund and has made five appearances to date in the Svenska Cupen in 1992/93, 2004, 2005, 2012 and 2014. During the season of 2012, Kvibille BK was eliminated in round one (in Svenska Cupen) against Torns IF with the score 1–3. Goal scorers: Nilsson, Grönevik and Rendin, Kvibille BK: Victor Jarälv. In 2014 Kvibille BK was eliminated in round one, with a 0–1 defeat against IS Halmia. Goal scorer: P.Gulda.

Season to season

Current squad

Footnotes

External links
 Kvibille BK – Official Website

Football clubs in Halland County
1940 establishments in Sweden